Komsomolskaya is a station on the Avtozavodskaya line of the Nizhny Novgorod Metro. The station opened on 8 August 1987 along with Avtozavodskaya station. Like Avtozavodskaya, it is adjacent to the massive GAZ automobile factory in the Avtozavodsky district of Nizhny Novgorod. The station's name comes from the Komsomolskaya checkpoint of the factory.

References

Nizhny Novgorod Metro stations
Railway stations in Russia opened in 1987
Railway stations located underground in Russia